Helga Amalia Thomas (8 July 1891 – 6 July 1988) was a Swedish film actress.

Thomas was born in Skog parish in Västernorrland County. She had a career in German film during the silent era, between 1923 and 1930. She died in Stockholm in 1988, two days before her 97th birthday.

Selected filmography 
 One Glass of Water (1923)
 Nora (1923)
 The Lost Shoe (1923)
 The Second Shot (1923)
 Rosenmontag (1924)
 The Man in the Fire  (1926)
 The Poacher (1926)
 A Day of Roses in August (1927)
 German Women - German Faithfulness (1927) 
 The Sinner (1928)
 Latin Quarter (1929)
 Beware of Loose Women (1929)
 Dawn (1929)

References 
 Kester, Bernadette. Film Front Weimar: Representations of the First World War in German films of the Weimar Period (1919-1933). Amsterdam University Press, 2003.
Helga Thomas in the Swedish Film Database

External links

1891 births
1988 deaths
Swedish film actresses
Swedish silent film actresses
20th-century Swedish actresses
People from Västernorrland County